George William Stanger (born 15 August 2000) is a professional footballer who plays as a defender for Alloa Athletic.

Born in Scotland, Stanger has represented New Zealand at youth level, including appearing at the Olympics.

Early and personal life
Stanger's father is former Scottish International rugby union player Tony Stanger, and his mother Bid is from Auckland, New Zealand. George was born in Melrose in the Scottish Borders; the family eventually settled in Dunblane.

Club career
Stanger began his career with Stirling Albion, joining Hamilton Academical in January 2018 before being loaned back to Stirling Albion for the rest of the season, making his senior debut in Scottish League Two. During the 2018–19 campaign he played for Hamilton's youth teams, including in the Scottish Challenge Cup and the UEFA Youth League.

In the summer 2019 transfer window, he was linked with a move away from Hamilton. He made his first professional-level start for the club in the Scottish Premiership on 24 August, a 3–1 home defeat to Motherwell in the Lanarkshire derby.

In September 2019 he moved on loan to East Kilbride. In January 2020 he moved on loan to Forfar Athletic.

He was released by Hamilton in October 2021 and joined University of Stirling in the Lowland Football League, before signing for Scottish League One side Dumbarton on loan in February 2022. He scored his first goal in senior football for the Sons in a 3–2 defeat to Airdrieonians in April 2022 but turned down a new deal following the club's relegation to Scottish League Two.

Stanger signed for Alloa Athletic in July 2022.

International career
Stanger represented  New Zealand at the 2019 FIFA U-20 World Cup. In June 2021 he was called up to New Zealand's squad for the delayed 2020 Summer Olympics.

References

2000 births
Living people
Sportspeople from the Scottish Borders
People from Dunblane
New Zealand association footballers
New Zealand under-20 international footballers
New Zealand people of Scottish descent
Scottish people of New Zealand descent
Scottish footballers
Stirling Albion F.C. players
Hamilton Academical F.C. players
East Kilbride F.C. players
Forfar Athletic F.C. players
University of Stirling F.C. players
Dumbarton F.C. players
Scottish Professional Football League players
Association football defenders
Footballers at the 2020 Summer Olympics
Olympic association footballers of New Zealand
Alloa Athletic F.C. players